The 1967 Appalachian State Mountaineers football team was an American football team that represented Appalachian State University as a member of the Carolinas Conference during the 1967 NAIA football season. In their third year under head coach Carl Messere, the Mountaineers compiled an overall record of 7–3, with a mark of 5–2 in conference play, and finished second in the Carolinas Conference.

Schedule

References

Appalachian State
Appalachian State Mountaineers football seasons
Appalachian State Mountaineers football